In mathematics, the Cuntz algebra , named after Joachim Cuntz, is the universal C*-algebra generated by  isometries of an infinite-dimensional Hilbert space  satisfying certain relations. These algebras were introduced as the first concrete examples of a separable infinite simple C*-algebra, meaning as a Hilbert space,  is isometric to the sequence space

and it has no nontrivial closed ideals. These algebras are fundamental to the study of simple infinite C*-algebras since any such algebra contains, for any given n, a subalgebra that has  as quotient.

Definitions 
Let n ≥  2 and  be a separable Hilbert space. Consider the C*-algebra  generated by a set

of isometries (i.e. ) acting on  satisfying

A simple C*-algebra is said to be purely infinite if every hereditary C*-subalgebra of it is infinite.  is a separable, simple, purely infinite C*-algebra. Any simple infinite C*-algebra contains a subalgebra that has  as a quotient.

Properties

Classification 

Relation between concrete C*-algebras and the universal C*-algebra 
Theorem. The concrete C*-algebra  is isomorphic to the universal C*-algebra  generated by n generators s1... sn subject to relations si*si = 1 for all i and ∑ sisi* = 1.

The proof of the theorem hinges on the following fact: any C*-algebra generated by n isometries s1... sn with orthogonal ranges contains a copy of the UHF algebra  type n∞. Namely  is spanned by words of the form

The *-subalgebra , being approximately finite-dimensional, has a unique C*-norm. The subalgebra  plays role of the space of Fourier coefficients for elements of the algebra. A key technical lemma, due to Cuntz, is that an element in the algebra is zero if and only if all its Fourier coefficients vanish.

The UHF algebra  has a non-unital subalgebra  that is canonically isomorphic to  itself: In the Mn stage of the direct system defining , consider the rank-1 projection e11, the matrix that is 1 in the upper left corner and zero elsewhere. Propagate this projection through the direct system. At the Mnk stage of the direct system, one has a rank nk − 1 projection. The corner

Cuntz algebras to represent direct sums 

The relations defining the Cuntz algebras align with the definition of the biproduct for preadditive categories. This similarity is made precise in the C*-category of unital *-endomorphisms over C*-algebras. The objects of this category are unital *-endomorphisms, and morphisms are the elements , where  if  for every . A unital *-endomorphism  is the direct sum of endomorphisms  if there are isometries  satisfying the  relations and

Generalisations 
Cuntz algebras have been generalised in many ways. Notable amongst which are the Cuntz–Krieger algebras, graph C*-algebras and k-graph C*-algebras.

Applied mathematics 
In signal processing, a subband filter with exact reconstruction give rise to representations of a Cuntz algebra. The same filter also comes from the multiresolution analysis construction in wavelet theory.

See also 

 Approximately finite-dimensional C*-algebra
 Hilbert C*-module

References

C*-algebras